Callistele is a genus of sea snails, marine gastropod mollusks in the family Trochidae, the top snails (unassigned to a subfamily).

Species
 Callistele calliston (Verco, 1905)

References

External links
 To World Register of Marine Species

 
Trochidae
Monotypic gastropod genera